Tom Daniel Bart Pietermaat (born 6 September 1992) is a Belgian footballer who plays for Patro Eisden.

References

External links

1993 births
Living people
Belgian footballers
Belgium youth international footballers
Association football defenders
K.V. Mechelen players
K. Rupel Boom F.C. players
S.C. Eendracht Aalst players
K.R.C. Mechelen players
K Beerschot VA players
K. Patro Eisden Maasmechelen players
Belgian Pro League players
Challenger Pro League players
Belgian National Division 1 players